Maningrida College is an early education through upper secondary (senior high) school in Maningrida, Northern Territory.  120 employees work for the school. Maningrida College is also a remote education provider for surrounding areas.

It first opened as a remote education provider in 1958. At first the institution had a single instructor.

References

External links
 Maningrida College

Public high schools in the Northern Territory
1958 establishments in Australia
Educational institutions established in 1958